In an estimate by Baruch Shalev, between 1901 and 2000 about 65.4% of Nobel prize winners were either Christians or had a Christian background. Here is a non exhaustive list of some of the prize winners who publicly identified themselves as Christians.

Physics 
By one estimate made by Weijia Zhang from Arizona State University and Robert G. Fuller from University of Nebraska–Lincoln, between 1901 and 1990, 60% of Physics Nobel prize winners had Christian backgrounds. In an estimate by Baruch Shalev, between 1901 and 2000, about 65.3% of Physics Nobel prize winners were either Christians or had a Christian background.

Chemistry 
In an estimate by Baruch Shalev, between 1901 and 2000, about 72.5% of Chemistry Nobel prize winners were either Christians or had a Christian background.

Physiology or Medicine 
In an estimate by Baruch Shalev, between 1901 and 2000, about 62% of  Medicine Nobel prize winners were either Christians or had a Christian background.

Literature 
In an estimate by Baruch Shalev, between 1901 and 2000, about 49.5% of Literature Nobel Prize winners were either Christians or had a Christian background.

Peace 
In an estimate by Baruch Shalev, between 1901 and 2000, about 78.3% of Peace Nobel Prize winners were either Christians or had a Christian background.

Economics 
In an estimate by Baruch Shalev, between 1901 and 2000, about 54.0% of Economics Nobel Prize winners were either Christians or had a Christian background.

See also 
 List of Nobel Peace Laureates
 List of black Nobel Laureates
 List of Jewish Nobel laureates
 List of Muslim Nobel laureates
 List of nonreligious Nobel laureates
 Nobel laureates of India
 List of Christian thinkers in science
 List of Nobel laureates by country
 List of Nobel laureates
 List of female Nobel laureates
 List of Catholic priests and religious awarded the Nobel Prize

References

Further reading

External links 
 
 Nobel Prizes by Universities and Institutes

Christian Nobel laureates
Christianity
Nobel laureates